Paradora is a genus of beetles in the family Buprestidae, containing the following species:

 Paradora corinthia (Fairmaire, 1901)
 Paradora impetiginosa (Gory, 1841)
 Paradora pumicata (Klug, 1833)
 Paradora saxosicollis (Fairmaire, 1897)
 Paradora zonata (Kerremans, 1899)

References

Buprestidae genera